The Churnet Valley Railway is a preserved standard gauge heritage railway in the Staffordshire Moorlands of Staffordshire, England. It operates on part of the former Churnet Valley Line.which was opened by the North Staffordshire Railway. 
The land from Leek Brook Junction to Ipstones was opened by Moorland & City Railways (MCR) in 2010 after they took a lease out from Network Rail. This has subsequently been purchased by the Churmet Valley Railway. The main stations along the line are Kingsley and Froghall, Consall, Cheddleton and Leek Brook (which is only used as a run around loop). Work has begun to extend the line to the town of Leek which will act as the northern terminus of the line. The line between Leek and Waterhouses has also been reopened as part of the heritage railway far as Ipstones.

Preservation history

Early days of preservation: Cheddleton station (1964–1977) 

The Cheshire and Staffordshire Railway Society (C&SRS) was formed in the 1970s by Ken Simpson and others to try to save some of the lines built by the old NSR, which first began to close in 1964. Their original target was the Biddulph Valley route which branched north from the Stoke-Leek line at Milton Junction, and headed north to Biddulph Wharf and Congleton, but Cheshire County Council showed only lukewarm interest. Leek station was also considered for a heritage line north of Rudyard Lake but was demolished in 1973. The society then aimed to re-open the Oakamoor to Alton Towers section, using the former Oakamoor tunnel for stock storage.

The council intended to demolish the station at Cheddleton in April 1974, but local businessman and parish councilor Norman Hancock parked his car on the level crossing in front of the bulldozers, preventing the demolition. This delay allowed the building to be Grade II listed on 14 May 1974 after a campaign by the C&SRS, Sir John Betjeman and the Victorian Society. In 1976 the former station building was let to the C&SRS to use as a museum.

The C&SRS became the North Staffordshire Railway Society (NSRS), Cheddleton station became Cheddleton Railway Centre, and the Churnet Valley Railway in effect began. The plans for the Oakamoor to Alton Towers track were put on hold, the old siding and goods yard at Cheddleton was purchased, and workshops were created with the first locomotives arriving in 1977. British Rail (BR) was at the time still using the adjacent railway to move industrial sand from the quarry at Oakamoor. This all resulted in the unusual sight of a Fowler tender being delivered to the NSRS at the rear of a sand train, arriving from Bescot, being uncoupled, and then left for the NSRS volunteers to crane over from the mainline into the NSRS yard before the sand train returned.

 Developments to first running: track bed acquisition (1978–1996) 
In 1978 the NSRS became the "North Staffordshire Railway Co. (1978) Ltd", which gained charity status in 1983. The bay platform area at Cheddleton was acquired in 1984 and the former NSR signal box from Clifton was put into use at the site, allowing demonstration runs to operate around the former goods yard. A commemorative plaque at the restored station acknowledges Norman Hancock and his role in ensuring the survival of the Jacobean-style building.

British Rail ceased using the remains of the former Churnet Valley Line in 1988, and the NSRC sought to purchase the stretch from Oakamoor to Leek Brook Junction. In 1992, the charity NSRC incorporated a subsidiary company: '''Churnet Valley Railway (1992) plc. In 1996, the company was granted a Light Railway Order to run  between Leek Brook Junction to Oakamoor Sand Sidings. (This was the last such order before the implementation of a new legal framework in the Transport and Works Act.) The company was also responsible for applications for planning permission and other legal necessities. The first public share issue was launched in 1995, to fund the purchase of the land and track, following an agreement with the British Railways Board. Share Issue 1 was well supported, particularly by the local community, and raised over £120,000. The purchase was completed on 4 July 1996. The trading activities of the NSRC were subsequently transferred to the CVR following this initial success.

 New stations: Consall and Kingsley & Froghall (1998–2003) 

Share issue 2 in 1998 aimed to raise £160,000 to upgrade the line south from Cheddleton to Consall for passenger services, which was successfully achieved on 11 July 1998.

Shortly after this, the next  section south to Kingsley & Froghall station was rehabilitated to provide an alternative to Cheddleton for visitors' car parking, and thus allow the business to expand. The third share issue was launched in the summer of 2000 in order to raise £185,000, and on 14 October 2000 "top and tailed" diesel-hauled passenger specials ran. Floods in November 2000 damaged at least three sections along the extension, but by 11 August 2001 the section of line was restored sufficiently to allow CVR's passenger regular operations to extend over the  line to Kingsley & Froghall, and on 19 July 2003 Kingsley & Froghall's re-constructed station building was opened by Pete Waterman.

 Upgrades and extension (2008–2011) 

This single platform at Kingsley & Froghall station was supplemented by the restoration of the second platform in 2008 using grant money. The wooden waiting shelter was re-built to the original 1849 design and incorporated the original brick foundations. A new foot crossing at the south of the platform (there never was a footbridge) replaced a previous foot crossing at the north end. The restoration project jointly won "The National Express East Coast Volunteers Award" at the National Railway Heritage Awards 2008.

The signal box at Leek Brook Junction was restored externally, and the platform and surrounding area were cleared of vegetation. Planning permission for full restoration of the site was granted in November 2011.

 Route 

From Kingsley & Froghall the railway passes the historic Thomas Bolton Copperworks factory (some of which is derelict, with other parts still in use) and meanders through the forested valley, through Hazles Wood and Booth's Wood and on towards Consall. The station here is sandwiched between the Caldon Canal and the River Churnet.

There is a nature park nearby, and the Black Lion public house sits on a bank overlooking the railway, canal, and river. This pub is unusual in that there are no public roads leading to it. Access is by foot, via the canal towpath, or the railway. Consall station has been signaled with a passing loop that allows two trains to run on special events and during high season.

Trains leaving Consall face a slight gradient as they begin the section towards Cheddleton. This section of the railway is also heavily forested, but after  or so the trees fall away to reveal open farmland and moorland.

Trains pass the motive power depot as they arrive at Cheddleton station, where locomotives under repair may be glimpsed in the yard. The Grade II listed Victorian station building at Cheddleton houses a small relics museum, toilets, a ticket office, and a waiting room.

In July 2011 a new catering facility the Goods Shed Tearoom was opened on the platform, marking the location of the original goods shed that once stood nearby. Continuing from Cheddleton, trains run past a caravan park and through the  tunnel (the fifth-longest tunnel on a UK heritage railway within preservation), emerging at Leekbrook Junction.

This was a four-way junction serving railways from Stoke, Leek, Alton, and the quarries at Cauldon. The former platform for the old St Edwards Hospital tramway has been restored, as has the sole surviving NSR signal box.

The CVR also owns the trackbed between Kingsley & Froghall and Oakamoor. The railway is in situ as far as the Oakamoor sand sidings, which once served the now-disused quarry, but the track is not up to standard for carrying passengers. In order to reach Oakamoor railway station the main line across the River Churnet and through Oakamoor tunnel needs to be rebuilt, which is one of the medium-term objectives of MCR as part of their plan to reopen the line to Alton (for Alton Towers).

 Signalling 

Signal boxes
Each station (or station site) served by passengers has a signal box, although only one is fully operational:

 Leek-Alton Towers section 
 Leek Brook: Only original box standing on the line. Externally restored as part of the Lottery funded "Churnet Valley Living Landscape Partnership" in 2014. Internally work is ongoing to return the box to service.
 Cheddleton: North Staffordshire Railway box relocated in 1978 from Elton. This houses a lever frame which allows access between the "main line" and the bay platform/motive power depot but operationally is regarded as a ground (shunt) frame, no other operational signalling equipment being present.
 Consall: The signal box came from Clifton, near Ashbourne and was stored for around 18 years in Cheddleton yard before moving to Consall in 2002. This is the only fully operational box on the railway, being commissioned in 2004 to allow two trains running.
 Kingsley and Froghall: Kingsley & Froghall never had a signal box at the station, the area instead having two boxes. One was located north of the station to control Bolton's sidings (an important industrial exchange site), the other being south of the station, controlling the junction to the small Froghall Wharf branch. In preservation, a platform box (from Rushton) has been installed NSR style on the down platform where it is used as an outpost for catering on high season days. It has no signalling equipment inside.

Current operations
The railway mostly runs the "one train staff" system, Consall box spending most of its time "switched out". The railway is split into three sections: Leekbrook Junction-Consall; Consall-Kingsley & Froghall; and Kingsley & Froghall-Oakamoor. The last of these, not being used for passenger trains, is protected by a stop board south of passenger operations at Froghall. Leek Brook-Ipstones is an additional fourth section as well, with its own separate signalling staff. Most running days see the Leekbrook Junction-Consall and Consall-Kingsley & Froghall staffs locked together with a single engine/train in service. On peak days they can be split, with Consall box opened, and a simple two-train service operated.

 Stations 

Passengers may join the railway at only three stations: Cheddleton, Consall and Kingsley and Froghall. Cheddleton is the operational headquarters and site of the motive power depot, engine shed and the carriage and wagon restoration workshops. The original Victorian station building houses the North Staffordshire Railway museum. There is also a refreshment room and booking office. Consall is a small rural station with Victorian buildings and waiting room. There is also a passing loop. Kingsley and Froghall station is newly built in the style of the old North Staffordshire Railway. There is a run-round loop of track and a watering column.

The CVR's station at Leek Brook is in passenger use, but there is no access to the platform other than the railway.

Given the various nearby former railway tracks, the CVR has various plans for expansion. Extension north to Leek is the current priority, where a platform has been granted outline planning permission. And works are ongoing to relay track to a site half a mile from the historic site of leek station. The former quarry at Oakamoor is planned to be converted into a holiday, for which the CVR hopes to re-open its line to connect with at the former sand sidings where a new platform will be built. South of the sidings is another bridge crossing over the River Churnet and the  "Oakamoor Tunnel" and Oakamoor railway station, which might be rehabilitated if a southern extension of the line is built to Alton Towers (which has the potential to service the nearby theme park), despite the former station buildings being a Landmark Trust-owned holiday property.

 Leek Brook-Waterhouses section 
 Bradnop
 36-yard "Bradnop Tunnel" directly north of station
 Former Bradnop station site cleared (no public access)
 Ipstones
 Apesford level crossing close by
 Current terminus of the route, no public access
 Platform not in-use, plans are being looked at for re-opening
 Winkhill
 No track at present (2014)
 Former station building now private residence
 Cauldon Lowe
 Track torn up for reuse at Endon
 Waterhouses
 Possible future terminus of the CVR
 Former Leek & Manifold signal box now a cycle hire
 Start of the Manifold Trail

 Awards 
 2005: National Railway Heritage Awards, Ian Allan Publishing Award, awarded for Consall station and signalling and Kingsley & Froghall station
 2008 National Railway Heritage Awards, National Express East Coast Volunteers Award, awarded for the reconstruction of the Up platform and waiting shelter at Kingsley and Froghall. The project was joint first with the Great Central Railway.
 2013: Winner of "ACES Best Dinner Award 2012"
 2015: Winner of "Best Use of Production Music in Radio Advertising" at Library Music Awards for Signal1 Radio "1940s Event" advert
 2016: Winner of Daily Mirror Top 10 UK Steam Train Trips
 2019: 9th in Telegraph Travel "Best One-Day Rail Journeys in the World"

 Media coverage 
 In 1983, Simon Groom visited as part of the BBC programme Blue Peter to cover the movement of the former signalbox from Clifton to Cheddleton
 In July 1985, Cheddleton station was used as the fictional Fuddlewich in the BBC series Happy Families starring Jennifer Saunders
 In April 2001, Vince Henderson visited to record the annual wartime event for an episode of Discovery Real Time's Off the Rails
 In September 2011 the line featured in an episode of Countryfile. The railway's diesel multiple unit was used for several interviews on the subject of the British "staycation effect". The programme featured several locations along the line, including Cheddleton & Consall stations and the demolished wire mills at Bolton's (Froghall) adjacent to the railway.
 In September 2012, the railway's diesel multiple unit featured on Ashbourne Radio in a two-part feature on DMU's and their wider impact when introduced to the UK's railways in the late 1950s. The coverage was also used to advertise the railway's diesel gala later that month.
 In January 2016, the railway was included in an episode of Michael Portillo's popular Great British Railway Journeys
 In September 2019, S160 5197 was featured in an episode of UKTV's Train Truckers, following the locomotives transfer from the CVR to Telford Steam Railway for their Polar Express specials. S160 5197 would later be featured again in another episode in August 2022, this time following a transfer from the CVR to Cholsey and Wallingford Railway which also held Polar Express specials.
 In January 2021, Canal Vbloggers Foxes Afloat visited the Churnet Valley for an episode, including a ride onboard 33021.
 In November 2021, the railway featured in an episode of Tim Dunn's, The Architecture the Railways Built, which looked at North Staffordshire as whole before focussing on Stoke Station, Alton Towers Station and Leek Brook Junction signal box.

 Failed and incomplete projects 

Whitebridge Lane cottage (2008–2010)
A landslip immediately south of the station at Cheddleton dating back to BR days has previously prevented the installation of a passing loop, and therefore the development of the original "down" platform. Various projects have looked at remedying this over the years. As part of the CVLLP scheme stage 1 of the bank stabilisation has been undertaken. This has proved successful and phase 2 will commence when funds and traffic demand it.

In November 2008 an investigation was undertaken for the proposed relocation of Whitebridge Lane Crossing cottage from its present location next to the West Coast Main Line at Stone to the "down" platform at Cheddleton. Empty since the last crossing keeper left in 1998, the building has been left derelict and vandalised as because of the building's current close proximity to the running line at Stone, it cannot be sold or put to any other use in its present location.

The portacabins located on the proposed site at Cheddleton were moved in early 2010 in anticipation for the move, and the ground cleared ready for the relocation works to start.

However, in 2011 increased costs from Network Rail resulted in the cancellation of the move, and a new tea room was constructed on the "up" platform.

Cheddleton Station (2014–present)
As part of the Churnet Valley Living Landscape Project, following the completion of phase 1 at Leek Brook the NSRC has devised phases 2, 3 & 4 that will see heritage items be restored to Cheddleton Station. It has been a long-held ambition to restore Cheddleton to its former glory, and in-turn create a living museum for visitors to enjoy. Phase 2 saw the re-erection of the former Hanley Water column (an original NSR column) on the "down" platform at the north end  This also included the erection of the Braithwaite Tank from Bolton's Works in the car park behind the "down" platform,

Also, separate from the CV LLP, a grant has been obtained to replace a number of the metal fences around Cheddleton with similar to the original NSR-style.

Involvement with Moorland & City Railways – share issue 4
In November 2010 the Churnet Valley Railway was hired to operate a series of events by Moorlands & City Railways to celebrate the re-opening of the Cauldon Branch to the public for the first time since 1935. The branch is noteworthy for its severe gradients, with roughly 5 miles (8.0 km) of 1-in-45/1-in-59 (2.2%/1.7%) in one direction and 2 miles (3.2 km) of 1-in-61 (1.6%) on the return journey. The summit of the line is at Ipstones, being 1,063 feet above sea level.

In 2011 an agreement was reached between CVR and MCR that allowed the CVR to operate services themselves over this branch, and since this date such trains have been run on the first weekend of every month between April and October plus additional special events such as enthusiast galas and private charters. This agreement required Churnet Valley Railway to purchase shares in MCR, and so in February 2011 publicity trains were run with 5199 and 33021 over the Cauldon line to launch this latest scheme first to current shareholders and then to the public. The overall target was £450,000 much higher than previous share issues, and the vast majority of this was raised which allowed the initial investment in MCR to go ahead.

In Summer 2014, CVR then re-opened share issue 4 under the "Ipstones Track Appeal" banner as following further discussions it had been decided to accept an offer from MCR to purchase the track work (sleepers, chairs, rails) of the remaining 4 miles (7.2 km) from Leek Brook to Ipstones from MCR. Track from the little-used section between Froghall and Oakamoor Quarry was lifted to make the first instalment, with a previous loan from CVR to MCR being converted into a second instalment.

The third payment was proposed to come from the re-launched share issue, and at first only current shareholders were invited to support. This brought in over half the required amount, and so in October 2014 the Ipstones Track Appeal was made public. The offer period was then extended at Christmas to Spring 2015 following which the full amount of shares were successfully sold.

 Future extensions 

 Northwards – Leek 

Also see "Leek (Churnet Valley) railway station" about the future of the proposed station.

It has always been the CVR long-term aim to re-open the line back into the market town of Leek, and after the Froghall extension of 2001 the railway made it clear that the extension into Leek was the next priority in terms of physical expansion.

The CVR have taken on the Leek project themselves, and after much dialogue with the council received outline planning permission for their own proposal in May 2018. They then launched their own project publicly on 1 February 2020. The Railway received a £1.4 million grant from the European Agricultural Fund for Rural Development, and hope to reinstate a rail triangle (only the second in preservation in the UK after Norton Fitzwarren on the West Somerset Railway).

A separate company are proposing redevelopments of the Barnfields estate in Leek, which is the mooted location for the new station. These plans were given Outline Planning Permission in December 2014, and include the construction of a new platform for the railway, new Marina connecting into the Leek branch of the Caldon Canal as well as a new restaurant and potentially a dedicated North Staffordshire Museum.

 Southwards 

To the south, from Froghall, the line is under the ownership of the CVR as far as the former sand sidings at Oakamoor even though as of 2014 the trackwork has been lifted. After this the line crossed over the River Churnet straight into a tunnel before Oakamoor station is reached. The track to the sidings requires upgrading for passenger use, and work on the tunnel and the rebuilding of the station site would be necessary to extend further than the former quarry, although it is considered viable. Whilst the railway owns the track as far as the sand sidings, the bridge, tunnel and trackbed beyond this is in the hands of Staffordshire County Council.

A new station platform called "Moneystone" (name of the former quarry) has been mooted at the site of the former sand sidings by the CVR to connect to a new Holiday Camp that has been proposed for the former quarry itself

Further south is Oakamoor itself, and then onto Alton Towers, where the station building has been restored although it is owned by the Landmark Trust. The prospect of running trains as far as Alton is potentially lucrative given the tourist potential provided by the popular Alton Towers which is located nearby. This is something of a long-term prospect, however, especially as this section of track now forms part of the National Cycle Network "National Route 54".

This  section (from Froghall-Alton Towers) is in principle regarded as commercially viable to reopen, and has been stated as a longer-term expansion aim of Moorland & City Railways.

The next station on the route south of Alton is Denstone, and the trackbed is clear of as far as the former platforms then a house has encroached on the former level crossing making expansion beyond Denstone back towards the mainline at Uttoxeter improbable without significant financial outlay.

 Westwards 

West of Leek Brook Junction is the  Stoke–Leek line. The line is part of the planned Moorland & City network (see separate section) and is mothballed by Network Rail pending work to return it to a usable condition. As the Churnet Valley Railway has certain running rights on the Moorland & City network, it is feasible that heritage steam trains could use the line once more.

Any possible extension towards Stoke-on-Trent railway station could see the Churnet Valley Railway interchange with commuter rail services on the West Coast Main Line once time, money and finances allow.

In 2011 vegetation was cleared on the section to allow a comprehensive survey of the track to be undertaken, and in 2012 extensive sleeper replacement began in order to bring the route up to passenger carrying standards. This was being completed by Churnet Valley Railway volunteers, in partnership with Moorland & City Railways, and supported by contractors where necessary.

Work stopped when a local resident made a village green application for the track bed, claiming that the line had become a village green through its lack of use as a railway for a number of years and that many locals used it as a footpath already. This was eventually rejected by Staffordshire County Council, as none of the criteria for village green status were met. Meanwhile, negotiations continued between MCR (plus CVR) and Network Rail to instate a heritage service on a restricted number of dates to Endon. In early 2013 it was announced that the CVR would be looking to take a tenancy out on part of the former station building to open a tea room, in order to create a presence within the village and signal its commitment to returning trains to the station. This tea room was subsequently opened on 13 January 2015 by a local couple and named 'The Station Kitchen'.

 Annual Enthusiast Galas 
Churnet Valley Railway have hosted enthusiast galas throughout the years with some of them being commemorative events celebrating 25 years of CVR, and the 40th Anniversary of the North Staffordshire Railway Company.

2010: Cauldon Lowe Re-opening
 Home Locomotives: GWR 5101 Class No. 5199, BR Class 33 No. 33021, BR Class 37 No. 37075, 104 DMU 50455 & 50517
 Guest Locomotives: BR 8P 71000 'Duke of Gloucester', SR West Country Class No. 34028 'Eddystone', LMS Black Five No. 44767 'George Stephenson', LMS 8F No. 8624, BR Class 25 No. 25059, BR Class 37 No. 37109

2011: Return of 33102
 Home Locomotives: BR Class 33 No. 33102 'Sophie', BR Class 33 No. 33021, BR Class 04 No. D2334, 104 DMU 50455 & 50517
 Guest Locomotives: BR Class 37 No. 37109

2012: Winter Steam Gala (completion of Cauldon loop)
 Home Locomotives: GWR 5101 Class No. 5199,
 Guest Locomotives: LMS Black Five No. 45379,
44767 failed prior to the event

2012: Autumn Diesel Gala
 Home Locomotives: BR Class 33 No. 33102 'Sophie', BR Class 33 No. 33021, BR Class 04 No. D2334, 104 DMU 50455 & 50517
 Guest Locomotives: BR Class 20 No. D8059,

2013: Winter Steam Gala
 Home Locomotives: USATC S160 No. 6046, LNER Class N7 No. 69621
 Guest Locomotives: SR U-Boat No. 31806,

2014: Winter Steam Gala (Opening of Ipstones Loop)
 Home Locomotives: S160 No. 6046, LNER Class N7 No. 69621
 Guest Locomotives: GWR Steam Railmotor No.93, SR West Country Class No. 34007 'Wadebridge' & Beyer, Peacock & Co 0-4-0ST No. 1827

2014: Anything Goes Gala (Launch of TKh 2944)
 Home Locomotives: TKh49 No. 2944 'Hotspur, LNER Class N7 No. 69621, BR Class 33 No. 33102 'Sophie', BR Class 33 No. 33021, 104 DMU 50455 & 50517
 Guest Locomotives: Beyer, Peacock & Co 0-4-0ST No. 1827

2015: Anything Goes Gala (Knotty Train)
 Home Locomotives: TKh49 No. 2944 'Hotspur, BR Class 33 No. 33102 'Sophie', BR Class 33 No. 33021, 104DMU 50455 & 50517
 Guest Locomotives: Haydock FoundryC 'Bellerophon'

2016: Winter Steam Gala
 Home Locomotives: USATC S160 No. 6046, TKh49 No. 2944 'Hotspur,
 Guest Locomotives: GWR 5600 Class 0-6-2T No. 5619

2016: Anything Goes Gala
 Home Locomotives: TKh49 No. 2944 'Hotspur, BR Class 33 No. 33102 'Sophie', 
 Guest Locomotives: BR Class 14 No. 14901, Moseley Railway Trust Kerr-Stuart no. 2395 'Stanhope'

2017: Winter Steam Gala (Double-headed S160s)
 Home Locomotives: USATC S160 Nos. 5197 & 6046, TKh49 No. 2944 'Hotspur,
 Guest Locomotives: SECR P class No. 323 'Bluebell'

2017: Anything Goes Cider Festival (Debut of D3800)
 Steam Locomotives: USATC S160 Nos. 5197,
 Diesel Locomotives: BR Class 33 No. 33102 'Sophie', BR Class 08 No. D3800, YEC Janus 2748 'Roger H Bennett

2017: CVR25 Anniversary Gala
 Home Locomotives: USATC S160 Nos. 5197, BR Class 33 No. 33102 'Sophie',
 Guest Locomotives: GWR Manor Class 7820 "Dinmore Manor", GWR 4200 Class No. 4277

2018: Winter Steam Gala 
 Home Locomotives: USATC S160 Nos. 5197 & 6046,
 Guest Locomotives: GWR 4200 Class No. 4277

2018: NSRC40 Ruby Anniversary Gala (Home Fleet)
 Steam Locomotives: USATC S160 Nos. 5197, TKh49 No. 2944 'Hotspur,
 Diesel Locomotives: BR Class 08 No. D3800, BR Class 33 No. 33102 'Sophie', BR Class 33 No. 33021 'Eastleigh', YEC Janus 2748 'Roger H Bennett

2019: Winter Steam Gala 
 Home Locomotives: USATC S160 Nos. 5197, TKh49 No. 2944 'Hotspur,
 Guest Locomotives: Caley Tank No. 419, Hunslet Austerity 0-6-0ST3694 'Whiston'

2019: Spring Diesel Gala 
 Home Locomotives: BR Class 08 No. D3800, BR Class 33 No. 33102 'Sophie', BR Class 33 No. 33021 'Eastleigh', YEC Janus 2748 'Roger H Bennett 
 Guest Locomotives: BR Class 31 No. 31271 'Stratford 1840-2001',

2020: Super Power: Take 2
 Home Locomotives: USATC S160 Nos. 5197 and 6046,
 Guest Locomotives: USATC S160 Nos. 2253 'Omaha',
* Originally planned for October 2019, event postponed following canal breach

 Locomotives 

 Steam locomotives Former residents' Diesel locomotives 

 Rolling stock 
 Coaching stock 
Coaching Stock in use on passenger trains consists entirely of ex-BR Mark 1 vehicles, with four or five forming a typical rake. These vehicles run in BR maroon livery which is historically correct for the railway's 1950s/1960s image. Only one rake is required for normal services.

Three Mark 1 vehicles are also used for the railway's Moorlander'' dining services. One is an authentic Kitchen Car, a second being a Second Open converted into a dining coach and then a former First Class Compartment now converted into a second dining coach. The first two coaches were overhauled and repainted between November 2009 and March 2010 into Pullman umber/cream following a vandal attack in 2009, but since 2015 the line has adopted a mock Northern Belle Plum & Cream livery for the dining service. During the COVID-19 pandemic all three coaches underwent a form of intermediate overhaul to keep them in their first-class standard.

Freight vehicles 
Typically for a railway of this size, the CVR does not yet have a dedicated wagon restoration group, maintenance of a nucleus of essential vehicles being undertaken by the more established Coach Works. Operational wagons tend to be examples which have an essential function rather than historical importance alone. Despite this though, following the restoration of Warflat WGF8123 in 2015 a small recreational Military Goods is now demonstrable on the line.

The fleet of goods/freight vehicles is relatively small, and can be summarised as follows:
 Sand Wagon BR WBB30025 PAA - bought by the NSRC in April 2018. Now sole surviving sand wagon that was once used to Oakamoor.
 Brake Van: LMS 731790 (Running repairs completed December 2014)
 Shark Brake Van: DB993867 (Purchased in Autumn 2020)
 Ballast Train: Rake of two Dogfish and two Catfish ballast wagons plus a Whale (DB 993363 / DB993431 / DB983710 / DB993545 / DB982390)
 Box Vans: There are five 4-wheel box vans serviceable in BR Bauxite livery and regularly used on Photo Charters
 Engineers: Bogie Bolster DB996724 is regularly used on Engineering trains, and Sole-surviving Parrot 3014 is under-going assessment for restoration. Both are on long-term hire from the National Railway Museum. Two privately owned Medfits are also on the line, though both require repairs before being available for service.
 There is also a 4-wheel former Esso oil tanker that was restored in 2007 and painted in the colours of a local Oil firm. Currently stored at Leek Brook (ESSO 2305).
 Ministry of Defence: A selection of vehicles arrived on the railway in 2011 after purchase from MoD Marchwood, and are awaiting restoration. The current pride of the fleet is Warflat WGF8123, with Ramp 95001 and Warwell 4341 also resident.
Several vans & well wagons exist around the railway, externally restored and used for storage purposes but they are not used in any trains.

Restoration of wagons is done sporadically. The Coach Works directed its full resources towards eight wagons for a significant part of 2007, the majority of the vehicles which formed a demonstration freight set. The ballast rake was restored in 2001, while all other vehicles have been restored by individual owners at various times.

There are no times when any freight stock is advertised as operating; however, the demonstration freight set sees occasional use during photographic charters and special events.

Supporting groups 
 The North Staffordshire Railway Co. (1978) Ltd. – charitable trust
 Churnet Valley Railway PLC (1992) – operating company
 Anglia Shunters Ltd – maintenance of resident Polish tanks
 Batt Holden Ltd - engineering support
 Churnet Valley Motive Power Department
 Churnet Valley Railway Telecoms Department
 Churnet Valley Railway Permanent Way Department

References

External links 
 
 Churnet Valley Railway
 Moorland & City Railways
 History of the North Staffordshire Railway plus news
 Information on the BBC Stoke & Staffordshire page 
 Heritage and Preserved Railways: Churnet Valley Railway from National Rail

Heritage railways in Staffordshire
Tourist attractions of the Peak District
Leek, Staffordshire